The 2013 Symetra Tour was a series of professional women's golf tournaments held from February through September 2013 in the United States. The Symetra Tour is the second-tier women's professional golf tour in the United States and is the "official developmental tour" of the LPGA Tour. It was previously known as the Futures Tour. In 2013, total prize money on the Symetra Tour was $1,625,000.

Leading money winners
The top ten money winners at the end of the season gained fully exempt cards on the LPGA Tour for the 2014 season.

Source

Schedule and results
The number in parentheses after winners' names show the player's total number of official money, individual event wins on the Symetra Tour including that event.

Source

Awards
Player of the Year, player who leads the money list at the end of the season
 P.K. Kongkraphan
Gaëlle Truet Rookie of the Year Award, first year player with the highest finish on the official money list
 Giulia Molinaro

Heather Wilbur Spirit Award, a player who "best exemplifies dedication, courage, perseverance, love of the game and spirit toward achieving goals as a professional golfer."
  Melissa Eaton

See also
2013 LPGA Tour
2013 in golf

References

External links

Symetra Tour
Symetra Tour